Just War is a novel by Lance Parkin from the Virgin New Adventures. The New Adventures were based on the long-running British science fiction television series Doctor Who. The novel featured the characters of the Seventh Doctor, Bernice Summerfield (known as Benny), Chris Cwej and Roz Forrester.

The story is set in Nazi Germany-occupied Guernsey, a rare example of part of the British Isles being 'colonised' by another power.

Plot
The Doctor and his companions land in German-occupied Guernsey in 1941 where the Nazis are pursuing a top-secret weapon which could change the course of the war.

Continuity

The novel features a predecessor to UNIT called "LONGBOW". In a thread on the Usenet group rec.arts.drwho as to what this stood for, Parkin admitted he had only got as far as "League Of Nations Global..." He accepted Chris Schumacher's suggestion of "League Of Nations Global Bizarre Occurrences Watch".

Notes
Parkin had recently completed an MA and his dissertation thesis was on postcolonial literature. The novel echoes that by showing reversals of familiar colonial perspectives.

Audio adaptation

In 1999, Just War was adapted by Big Finish Productions into an audio drama starring Lisa Bowerman as Bernice. The plot was changed to fit in with the run of Bernice audio dramas. Big Finish had begun by adapting New Adventure novels from after when Virgin had lost their licence to do Doctor Who stories and the series had focused on Benny. Big Finish also had no Doctor Who licence at the time, but they decided to dramatise two Doctor Who New Adventures, adapting them to remove the Doctor Who references. Thus, the audio adaptation achieves time travel through the use of Benny's Time Rings. The Doctor, Chris and Roz are removed from the narrative, with Jason Kane's role replacing some elements of the parts played by the Doctor and Chris from the novel.

The adaptation was done by Jacqueline Rayner, who adapted most of this first series of Benny audios.

Cast
Bernice Summerfield — Lisa Bowerman
Jason Kane — Stephen Fewell
Oberst Oskar Steinmann — Michael Wade
Standardtenfuhrer Joachim Wolff — Mark Gatiss
Ma Doras — Maggie Stables
Nurse Rosa Kitzel — Nicky Golding
Private Franz Hutter — Anthony Keetch
Private Gerhard Flur — Simon Moore

References

External links
The Cloister Library - Just War  New Adventure

Fiction set in 1941
1996 British novels
1996 science fiction novels
Virgin New Adventures
Bernice Summerfield audio plays
British science fiction novels
Novels by Lance Parkin
Novels set in Guernsey
Novels about World War II alternate histories
Seventh Doctor novels